Yaleh Gonbad (also known as Emāmzādeh, Imamzade-Ele-Geumbez, and Imāmzādeh) is a village in Ilat-e Qaqazan-e Gharbi Rural District, Kuhin District, Qazvin County, Qazvin Province, Iran. At the 2006 census, its population was 429, in 105 families.

References 

Populated places in Qazvin County